The Serbia national beach soccer team represents Serbia in international beach soccer competitions and is controlled by the Football Association of Serbia, the governing body for football in Serbia. Team Serbia made a debut at the 2016 Euro Beach Soccer Cup, taking place in Serbian capital of Belgrade, losing in the quarterfinal to Hungary, 0–6.

Current squad
Current as of June 2016

Coach: Dejan Knežević

Competitive record

FIFA Beach Soccer World Cup qualification (UEFA)

Euro Beach Soccer Cup

Euro Beach Soccer League

Achievements
2016 Season
 Euro Beach Soccer Cup debut

References

External links
  Team profile on Beach Soccer Russia
 Team profile at Beach Soccer Worldwide

European national beach soccer teams
national sports teams of Serbia